= Mokrsko mine =

Gold mine in Central Bohemian Region, Czech Republic

Coordinates: 49°44′40.8″N 14°20′35.3″E

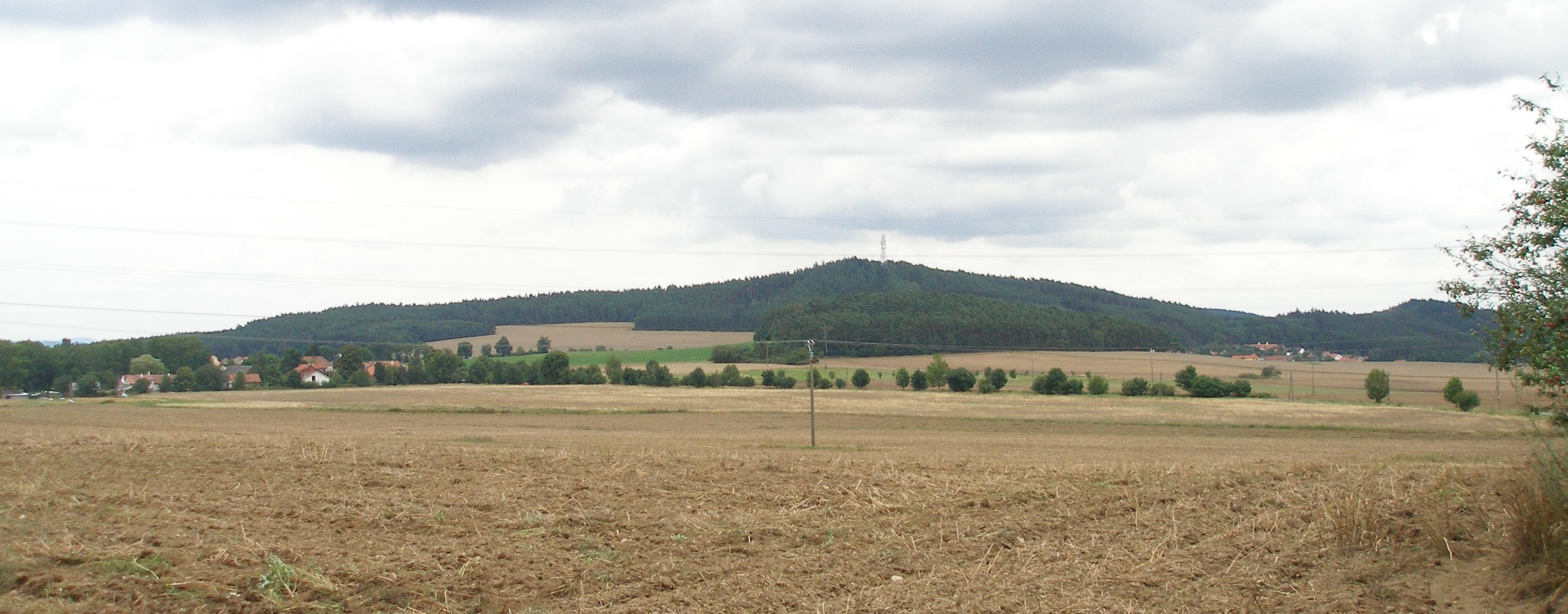
- The gold of the Mokrsko mine is located inside the Veselý kopec hill.
- Interactive map of Mokrsko mine
- Location: Central Bohemian Region, Czech Republic
- Products: Gold

The Mokrsko mine is one of the largest gold mines in Czech Republic and in the world. The mine is located in the center of the country in the Central Bohemian Region. The mine has estimated reserves of 3.2 million oz of gold.
